Oops TV is a British television programme which features comedic video clips of people and animals, broadcast between February 2009 and November 2010, hosted and narrated by Justin Lee Collins.

References

External links
Official website

Sky UK original programming
2000s British comedy television series
2010s British comedy television series
2009 British television series debuts
2010 British television series endings
Video clip television series
English-language television shows